Murray Farm is a historic farmhouse in Readyville, Tennessee, U.S..

History
The farm was founded in the 1820s for William H. Murray, a corn and livestock farmer who owned 20 slaves by 1850. It was passed on to his son Hiram in 1851, who owned 39 slaves prior to the American Civil War of 1861–1865. Hiram served in the Confederate States Army, and some of his slaves became tenant farmers in the postbellum era. By 1874, the farm was inherited by his Hiram's son, Davis, who lived here with his wife and their six children.

Architectural significance
The house was designed in the I-house style. A portico designed in the Greek Revival architectural style was added in 1851. It has been listed on the National Register of Historic Places since July 31, 1991.

References

Houses on the National Register of Historic Places in Tennessee
Greek Revival architecture in Tennessee
Houses completed in 1823
Buildings and structures in Rutherford County, Tennessee
I-houses in Tennessee
1823 establishments in Tennessee